The Battle of Mount Li (Li Shan)  was a decisive clash that occurred in Ancient China in 771 BC near the twin cities of Haojing and Fengjing, often referred to together as Fenghao. The battle was fought between the dynastic army of King You of Zhou and the combined armies of the rebel states of Shen and Zeng and the vicious Quanrong barbarians. The outcome was a crushing victory for the insurgents that led to the dynasty's weakening and fragmentation.

Background 
King You of Zhou assumed the throne at a very young age. Being immature and rebellious, he couldn't care less for state affairs. He was married to the daughter of the mighty Marquess of Shen, a fieflord under Zhou vassalage, and they had a son named Yijiu. King You was given a new concubine named Baosi by one of his officers' son in charge for his father's release from prison. Baosi was extremely beautiful and King You favoured her over the queen, which caused major grievances within the court. These grievances increased when Baosi gave birth to a boy called Bofu. One day Yijiu and his supporters entered the room where Baosi was and tried to kill her. King You was furious and stripped Yijiu of his royal position and sent him back to the Marquess of Shen, and also deposed his mother the queen and sent her to a prison-room, making Bofu the new prince and Baosi the new queen. The Marquess of Shen was outraged and desperate to free his daughter.

Meanwhile, Youwang was deeply amazed by Baosi. He didn't yet suspect that the long and great reign of the Zhou house was about to suffer a deadly blow, of which it would never recover. He hardly thought of anything but Baosi, but there was something about her that made him concerned: she hardly smiled. Being an unwilling wife and state gift, she naturally had few reasons to be happy, but it didn't prevent You from trying his best. At first, none of his efforts was successful. She showed little interest in music, drink, jokers, and anything else. The king went to such state of despair that he merged all of the court officers and offered the wealthy reward of one thousand pieces of gold to anyone who could make the queen laugh. A corrupt officer suggested using the beacon towers of Mount Li to call the allied armies. Youwang liked the idea and brought Baosi in his chariot to the top of the mountain, bringing drink and the whole court with him. The beacons were lit and the vassal states sent their armies in a hurry to the capital, where they met in great numbers. Messengers were sent from the top to inform them there was no danger and the sign was nothing but a prank. Baosi was caught giving laughter as the allies left the mountain foothills in confusion. The king liked it so much that he repeated the prank many times. One day, however, he received a letter from the Marquess of Shen demanding his daughter to be released, but the king was furious and planned to attack Shen. The Marquess of Shen made an alliance with the Quanrong barbarians and the state of Zeng and attacked Haojing first.

The battle
King You ordered his men to light the beacon tower, and put his minister Guo Shifu in charge of his infantry and Guogong in charge of his chariots and sent them ahead to hold on the enemy. Seeing his numerical disadvantage, Guo Shifu ordered Guogong to tease the enemies and ordered his own regiment to run back to the capital. Guogong was left alone and desperately led his 200 chariots to try to stop the attack, but failed and was killed.

Upon seeing that not a single ally would come to his aid, Duke Huan of Zheng, King You's uncle, summoned his own guard and merged it with the remnants of the royal army, called along all the court ministers and their families and fled the capital with the King through the east gate. Shortly after, the city was taken by the Quanrong, who sacked its riches, enslaved its people and burned down all of its buildings. The Marquess of Shen's men tried to stop the fire to no avail, and went into a desperate search for their lord's daughter. They found her at last in the burning palace and took her out. The forces of Shen refused to persecute the king, so the Quanrong did it alone.

King You's refugees were fleeing hastily eastwards, but the mounted units of the Quanrong began to approach them quickly and surround them from the sides. King You could already see the fort of Mount Li in the horizon when his fellows' wives and children tired out and could follow no longer. Standing already on the foothills of Mount Li, the Zhou people stopped and fell under heavy attack. Duke Huan was slain and King You tried to form up his men, but they were soon annihilated - king, soldier, woman and child alike. Baosi was taken as trophy for the Quanrong leader.

Aftermath 
The battle ended in a decisive victory for Shen. The twin cities were sacked and left in ruins, Baosi was captured and Bofu, still a child, was killed in front of her. The Son of Heaven was slain in Mount Li side by side with Huan, Duke of Zheng. The land surrounding Fenghao and Lishan was conquered and occupied by the Quanrong. The Marquess of Shen later managed to get Baosi for himself and freed her. Yijiu was made king in Shen with the name Ping of Zhou, but his coronation was supported only by three states, including Shen and Zeng. The vassal nobles sent escorts to rescue treasures and survivors in the ruined capital.

The states of Qin and Jin thought of Yijiu as the only possible person to inherit the throne in order to preserve the Zhou dynasty, so together they helped him and his court move to the new capital at Wangcheng. The Qin soon partially avenged the fallen king by attacking and destroying the Quanrong and taking back the lost territory for the Zhou. The new king was unpopular and poorly supported by most states due to the circumstances of his coronation, and Wangcheng was never as great and imposing as Haojing. Besides, the Zhou dynasty relied totally on its allies for protection since its own army had just been annihilated in battle.

Although the Mandate of Heaven remained with the Zhou, China became increasingly fragmented after that, and would soon fall into a long age of conflict for hegemony that would last over five centuries.

References
 Sima Qian, Records of the Grand Historian

770s BC
Mount Li
8th century BC in China
Mount Li
Zheng (state)